Clairvaux Prison is a high-security prison in France, on the grounds of the former Clairvaux Abbey

History
Clairvaux Abbey was founded in 1115 by Bernard of Clairvaux. During the French Revolution, it became property of the State. In 1808, Napoleon turned it into a prison. A good part of the abbey's manuscripts are now in the Médiatéque du Grand Troyes (Grand Troyes Media Library).

The initial prisoners were rebellious soldiers. After the collapse of the Paris Commune in 1871, a number of Communards were held there. Revolutionary Louis Auguste Blanqui spent some time in solitary. It became the largest French penitentiary of the 19th century. Communist militant Guy Môquet was imprisoned there by the Vichy government.

1971 revolt
In 1971, two convicts, Claude Buffet and Roger Bontems, took as hostages a nurse, Nicole Comte, and a prison guard, Guy Girardot. Buffet subsequently murdered them. Buffet and Bontems were captured. Bontems, whose defence counsel included Robert Badinter, contended that the murder was Buffet's idea. Buffet said that he wanted death. Both were sentenced to death by the "assises" court in June 1972 and were guillotined.

2006 manifesto 
On 16 January 2006, several detainees who were serving life sentences in Clairvaux Prison, having each spent from 6 to 28 years in prison, signed a manifesto denouncing the "false" abolition of the death penalty. They declared that it had resulted in a slow and continuous punishment, a death in life. They called for restoration of the death penalty.

The convicts specifically denounced the French Republic which claimed, in accordance with the "advises of the European Council", that the "enforcing of prison sentences... has been conceived not only to protect society and assure the punishment of the convict, but also to favour his amendment and prepare his rehabilitation". They stated, "In reality: everything is for the punishment."

Present day
As of 2022, there were forty prisoners held at the facility, but by September 2023 they are expected to be transferred to another prison.

Notable prisoners 
The Russian anarchist Peter Kropotkin was imprisoned in Clairvaux for the four years between 1883 and 1886.
Carlos the Jackal, international terrorist. Transferred to Clairvaux in 2006.

In fiction 
 Victor Hugo's short story "Claude Gueux" is set in Clairvaux.

References

Sources 
 Clairvaux Prison - Ministry of Justice

External links
 L'Association Renaissance de Clairvaux

Prisons in France
Buildings and structures in Aube
Ville-sous-la-Ferté